Pietro Scandelli (16 October 1941 – 5 October 2020) was an Italian racing cyclist. He won stage 21 of the 1966 Giro d'Italia.

References

External links
 

1941 births
2020 deaths
Italian male cyclists
Italian Giro d'Italia stage winners
People from Crema, Lombardy
Cyclists from the Province of Cremona